Hey Everyone! is the debut album by Glasgow-based rock band Dananananaykroyd, released on 6 April 2009 on the Best Before Records label. The album debuted on the UK Albums Chart at number 154 in its week of release.

Initial critical reception was generally positive, ClashMusic.com commenting: "Dananananaykroyd have made a debut album as unforgettable as their name is unwieldy, and it is a magnificent achievement." This Is Fake DIY also reviewed the album positively, saying "this is an album that's both satisfyingly violent, subtly tuneful and, dare we say it, not so hard to swallow that it has to stay an underground concern."

An NME review criticised the track order of the album, claiming that the three singles "Black Wax", "Totally Bone" and "Pink Sabbath" being grouped together was an unwise choice.

Recording
The record was recorded in the Machine Shop in Hoboken, New Jersey in July and August 2008. The music was recorded almost completely live in one room, John Baillie Jnr's vocals were recorded with Machine while Calum Gunn's were recorded separately in Southern Studios in London. While recording,  the band's guitarist David Roy made home movies which are now on Vimeo.

Track listing

References

External links
Official Danananaykroyd website

Dananananaykroyd albums
2009 albums
Albums produced by Machine (producer)